Roisin Dunne Ross (born 18 September 1965) is an Irish musician. She is best known for being the replacement guitarist of 7 Year Bitch, after their guitarist Stefanie Sargent died in June 1992.

Ross played on the 7 Year Bitch albums ¡Viva Zapata! and  Gato Negro with Atlantic Records.  She eventually left the band to pursue other opportunities.

Discography

Albums
 ¡Viva Zapata!  (C/Z Records, 1994).
 Gato Negro (Atlantic Records, 1996).

Singles
 "Rock-A-Bye Baby" b/w "Wide Open Trap" (C/Z Records, 1994).
 "The History of My Future" b/w "24,900 Miles Per Hour" (promo only) (Atlantic Records, 1996).
 "Miss Understood" b/w "Go!" (Man's Ruin, 1996).

Music Videos
"In Lust You Trust"  (1992)
"Hip Like Junk" (1994)
"24,900 Miles Per Hour" (1996)

Films
 The Gits: Movie (2005)

References

American punk rock guitarists
1965 births
Living people
Irish emigrants to the United States
Irish rock guitarists
7 Year Bitch members
20th-century American guitarists
Feminist musicians
20th-century American women guitarists
21st-century American women
Women in punk